Starr Struck: Best of Ringo Starr, Vol. 2 is Ringo Starr's second official compilation album, released in the US in 1989.

Content
The successor to 1975's Blast from Your Past, it rounds up Starr's highlights from 1976's Ringo's Rotogravure to 1983's Old Wave and encompasses label stays with Polydor, Atlantic, Portrait, and RCA. Consequently, it saw the first release of four tracks from Old Wave which had not been issued in the US up to that time. The CD edition features four additional tracks that were not present on the vinyl edition: "Attention", "Who Needs a Heart", "Hopeless" and "You Belong to Me". The cover photo was originally for the unreleased version of Stop and Smell the Roses (1981), entitled Can't Fight Lightning.

Release
The album was issued on 24 February 1989 by Rhino, only in the US. Never charting anywhere, Starr Struck: Best of Ringo Starr, Vol. 2 went out of print during the 1990s.

Track listings

LP edition

CD edition

References
 Footnotes

 Citations

External links
JPGR's Starr Struck: Best of Ringo Starr, Vol. 2 site

1989 greatest hits albums
Albums produced by Arif Mardin
Albums produced by Paul McCartney
Albums produced by George Harrison
Albums produced by Joe Walsh
Albums produced by Vini Poncia
Ringo Starr compilation albums
Rhino Records compilation albums
Albums produced by Ringo Starr